Visible Man or The Visible Man may refer to:

Anatomy models
"The Visible Man" and "The Visible Woman", plastic toys created by sculptor Marcel Jovine for Pyro Plastics Corporation
Visible Human Project

Books
The Visible Man, science fiction stories by Gardner Dozois  1975 
 Visible Man, novel about racism by George Gilder 1978  
 Becoming a Visible Man, Jamison Green 2004
 The Visible Man, novel by Chuck Klosterman 2011
Visible Man, biography of Henry Dumas by Jeffrey B. Leak 2014
The Visible Man, comic series in 2000 AD (comics)

Film
The Visible Man, art documentary about Benny Andrews VHS, 1996

Music
The Visible Men, band
The Visible Man (album), limited edition remix album by David Byrne 1998